Big Valley District-Lake County AVA is an American Viticultural Area located in Lake County, California.  There was 6 wineries within the viticultural area, as well as 43 commercially-producing vineyards covering approximately  when officially established by the Alcohol and Tobacco Tax and Trade Bureau (TTB) in October 2013 alongside the adjacent  Kelsey Bench AVA.
  
Big Valley District is in a large valley near Clear Lake, the Mayacamas mountain range, and the dormant Mount Konocti volcano. The AVA is in the less hilly area near  Kelseyville; the hillier areas are  part of the Kelsey Bench AVA.  Big Valley is a structural basin that is part of the larger Clear Lake basin.

Sauvignon Blanc grape variety makes up the majority of the region's plantings in addition to producing Zinfandels and Cabernet Francs.

References

External links
  Shannon Ridge,  Family of Wines

American Viticultural Areas of California

American Viticultural Areas
Geography of Lake County, California
1991 establishments in California